Josh D'Amaro is an American businessman, who is Chairman of Disney Parks, Experiences and Products. Before becoming Chairman, D'Amaro has had a 22-year career with The Walt Disney Company, particularly in his positions across the resorts sector of the company.

Education and early career
In 1993, D'Amaro graduated from Georgetown University with a Bachelor's Degree in Business Administration. He began his career in the finance department of The Gillette Company based in Boston before joining The Walt Disney Company in 1998.

Career in The Walt Disney Company

For the first 10 years of his career at Disney, D'Amaro held various leadership positions. From 1998 to 2008 he was vice president of sales and travel trade marketing. During that time he was also director of business planning and strategy development from 2005 to 2006. In 2008, he became chief financial officer of Disney Consumer Products Licensing business and held the position for two years.

Positions within Disney Parks, Experiences and Products
In 2010, he was promoted to vice president of Adventures by Disney based in Celebration, Florida. This position meant he oversaw all group guided tour operations to various U.S and international destinations.

From 2013 to 2014, D'Amaro served as vice president of Disney's Animal Kingdom. Ultimately, D'Amaro was vice president as the theme park planned its major expansion to include Pandora - The World of Avatar, the joint venture between Disney and James Cameron and the largest expansion in its history. After the expansion of Disney's Animal Kingdom began construction, in the September 2014, D'Amaro became senior vice president of Resort & Transportation Operations at the Walt Disney World Resort in Florida, working in this position until February 2017.

From 2017 to 2020, D'Amaro's positions within Parks, Experiences and Products changed quickly. In 2017, he was promoted to CCO of the Walt Disney World Resort, a higher position that he only held for a year before taking on the role of president of Disneyland Park in Anaheim, California another role he only did for a year and a half, before returning to Florida to become president of Walt Disney World Resort.

In 2020, Bob Chapek succeeded Bob Iger as CEO of The Walt Disney Company. On May 18, 2020, D'Amaro succeeded Chapek as chairman of Disney Parks, Experiences and Products during the COVID-19 pandemic. The chairmanship means D'Amaro is responsible for the management of attractions, cruise ships, merchandise and retail of all six theme parks in California, Florida, France, Shanghai, Hong Kong and Tokyo.

On September 29, 2020, during the Covid-19 pandemic, Disney was forced to cut 28,000 employees from its theme parks. Despite the phased reopening of many Disney resorts around the world during the summer of 2020, Disneyland Resort in California was unable to reopen its theme parks and furloughed cast members and staff.

In the beginning of April 2021, as Covid restrictions were being lifted, D'Amaro had set about reopening certain Disney parks and services to the public. On April 30, 2021, Disney reopened Disneyland Park in Anaheim, which was the final Disney resort to reopen after the initial closure. Disneyland Paris reopened on June 17 after the second closure on October 30, 2020, making it the final Disney parks and resorts to be reopened overall and one of two Disney resorts to close-reopen-and-close due to local government restrictions, the other being Hong Kong Disneyland.

References

External links
Corporate biography

Chairmen of The Walt Disney Company
Walt Disney Parks and Resorts people
McDonough School of Business alumni
Procter & Gamble people
Year of birth uncertain
Living people
1970s births
People from Los Angeles